Halsman is a surname. Notable people with the surname include:

Bradley Halsman (born 1993), Scottish footballer
Jordan Halsman (born 1991), Scottish footballer
Philippe Halsman, Latvian-born American portrait photographer

See also
Halsman murder case, murder of Max Halsman